King of the Channel may refer to:

King of the Channel (swimming)
King of the Channel (rowing)